is the predominant style of professional wrestling that has developed in Japan. The term became popular among English-speaking fans due to Hisaharu Tanabe's activities in the online Usenet community. Growing out of origins in the traditional US style of wrestling, it has become an entity in itself. Japanese pro wrestling is distinct in its psychology and presentation of the sport. It is treated as a legitimate fight, with fewer theatrics; the stories told in Japanese matches are about a fighter's spirit and perseverance. In strong style, the style most typically associated with puroresu, full contact martial arts strikes and shoot submission holds are implemented.

Overview 
Despite some similarities to the popular style of professional wrestling in the United States, Japanese wrestling is known for many differences from the Western style. Puroresu is known for its "fighting spirit" (tōkon), and the wrestlers are known for their full contact strikes. Many Japanese wrestlers have some degree of knowledge in many different martial arts and wrestling styles; because of this, there are usually doctors and trainers at ringside for assisting the wrestlers after a match.  Most matches have clean finishes and many of the promotions do not use any angles or gimmicks. Japanese wrestling is also known for its relationship with fellow mixed martial arts promotions. Puroresu remains popular, and it draws huge crowds from the major promotions. With this and its relationship with other martial arts disciplines, the audiences and wrestlers treat puroresu as a combat sport.

It should be also noted that the term "Puroresu" in Japan refers to all professional wrestling, regardless of country of origin. For example, American promotions WWE and Ring of Honor are referred to as "Puroresu" in Japan. Japanese wrestling historian Fumi Saito noted: "Puroresu is completely Japanese-English, and in the U.S. the same word is used for both pro and amateur wrestling. It may be easier to understand if you think of wrestling in the U.S. as having the same nuance as 'sumo' in Japanese. You call both 'wrestling' even if it's competitive or professional wrestling."

Rules 
Puroresu has a variety of different rules, which can differ greatly from wrestling in other countries. While there is no governing authority for puroresu, there is a general standard which has developed. Each promotion has its own variation, but all are similar enough to avoid confusion. Any convention described here is simply a standard, and may or may not correspond exactly with any given promotion's codified rules.

General structure 
Matches are held between two or more sides ("corners"). Each corner may consist of one wrestler, or a team of two or more. Most team matches are governed by tag team rules (see below).

The match is won by scoring a "fall", which is generally consistent with standard professional wrestling:
 Pinning an opponent's shoulders to the mat for the referee's count of three.
 Submission victory, which sees the wrestler either tap out or verbally submit to their opponent.
 Knockout, the failure to regain composure at the referee's command.
 Countout, the failure of a party to return to the ring at the referee's command, which is determined by a count of twenty (some federations use ten, but in Japanese wrestling they use twenty).
 Disqualification, the act of one wrestler breaking the rules.
 Referee Stoppage, when an official deems a participant unfit to continue wrestling (either pre-planned or due to legitimate injury)

Additional rules govern how the outcome of the match is to take place. One such example would be the Japanese Universal Wrestling Federation, as it does not allow pinfall victories in favor of submissions and knockouts; this is seen as an early influence of mixed martial arts, as some wrestlers broke away from traditional wrestling endings to matches in favor of legitimate outcomes. Another example is that most promotions disallow punches, so many wrestlers utilize open handed strikes and stiff forearms; this rule was also applied in the early stages of Pancrase.

Styles

Strong style 
New Japan Pro-Wrestling, headed by Antonio Inoki, used Inoki's "strong style" approach of wrestling as a combat sport, influenced strongly by the styles of catch wrestlers Lou Thesz and Karl Gotch. Wrestlers incorporated kicks and strikes from martial arts disciplines, and a strong emphasis was placed on submission wrestling. Many of New Japan's wrestlers, including top stars such as Shinya Hashimoto, Riki Choshu, Minoru Suzuki, Shinsuke Nakamura and Keiji Mutoh, came from a legitimate martial arts background.

Ōdō ("King's Road") 
Ōdō ("King's Road"; also translated as "Royal Road") is a style which originated in All Japan Pro Wrestling, and is most closely associated with the Four Pillars (四天王, Shitennō), the informal nomenclature for 1990s AJPW wrestlers Toshiaki Kawada, Kenta Kobashi, Mitsuharu Misawa, and Akira Taue. However, matches involving these four have been also referred to in Japan as Shitennō puroresu. As opposed to strong style's European catch wrestling influences, ōdō opted for a more "narrative" style, derived from the American model of professional wrestling as physical storytelling. However, ōdō distinguished itself from American professional wrestling by largely eschewing many of its storytelling devices. Angles and gimmicks were virtually non-existent, as all the storytelling in ōdō occurred through the matches themselves. Blading was also banned outright. Because Baba disliked submissions, they were also eschewed for decisive pinfalls. In 2011, Japanese wrestling magazine G Spirits cited Misawa's July 29, 1993 Triple Crown Heavyweight Championship title defense against Kawada as the first match in the Shitennō style, and the 1993 World's Strongest Tag Determination League final, in which Misawa and Kobashi wrestled Kawada and Taue,  was referred to as the "completed form" of the style by Tokyo Sports in 2014. According to Kawada, ōdō matches, which placed a heavy emphasis on fighting spirit, were about "breaking the limit you set in the last". AJPW referee Kyohei Wada, who recounted that Baba told his talent "whatever you want to do, do it, and whatever you can show the people, show it", would later compare his job officiating these matches to "conducting a symphony".

However, this escalation eventually manifested through the use of dangerous maneuvers that focused on the head and neck, particularly during the finishing stretches of ōdō matches. The physical consequences of this style, or at least its use of head drops, has often been cited as the underlying reason for Misawa's death after an in-ring accident in 2009. Professional wrestling journalist and historian Dave Meltzer noted after his death that Misawa "regularly took psychotic bumps", including back suplexes where he would land on his head. AJPW would steer away from ōdō after Misawa led a mass exodus to form Pro Wrestling Noah, particularly when Motoko Baba sold her stock to Keiji Mutoh, but Noah would continue to practice ōdō in its booking.  This element of ōdō has been criticized for its negative influence on professional wrestling, and 1990s All Japan been cited as a cautionary tale in response to legitimately dangerous maneuvers. Meltzer wrote in 2009 that head drops were "never necessary", as Misawa and his peers in AJPW were already "having the best matches in wrestling" before they incorporated these maneuvers into their style.

Other styles 
Throughout the 1990s, three individual styles—shoot style, lucha libre, and hardcore—were the main divisions of independent promotions, but as a result of interpromoting, it is not unusual to see all three styles on the same card.

Joshi puroresu 
Puroresu done by female wrestlers is called  or joshi puro for short. Women's professional wrestling in Japan is usually handled by promotions that specialize in joshi puroresu, rather than divisions of otherwise male-dominated promotions as is the case in the United States (a major exception was FMW, a men's promotion which had a small women's division, but even then depended on talent from women's federations to provide competition). However, joshi puroresu promotions usually have agreements with male puroresu promotions such that they recognize each other's titles as legitimate, and may share cards.

All Japan Women's Pro-Wrestling was the dominant joshi organization from the 1970s to the 1990s. AJW's first major star was Mach Fumiake in 1974, followed in 1975 by Jackie Sato and Maki Ueda, known as the "Beauty Pair".  The early 1980s saw the fame of Jaguar Yokota and Devil Masami, major stars of the second wave of excellent workers who took the place of the glamour-based "Beauty Pair" generation. That decade would later see the rise of Chigusa Nagayo and Lioness Asuka, known as the "Crush Gals", who as a tag team achieved a level of unprecedented mainstream success in Japan, unheard of by any female wrestler in the history of professional wrestling all over the world. Their long running feud with Dump Matsumoto and her "Gokuaku Domei" ("Atrocious Alliance") stable would become extremely popular in Japan during the 1980s, with their televised matches resulting in some of the highest rated broadcasts in Japanese television as well as the promotion regularly selling out arenas.

In 1985, Japan's second women's wrestling promotion formed in Japan Women's Pro-Wrestling. The promotion ran their first show on August 17, 1986. It featured Jackie Sato who returned from retirement and future stars such as Shinobu Kandori, Mayumi Ozaki, Cutie Suzuki and Dynamite Kansai, who would go on to be top stars in LLPW and JWP.

In 1992, Japan Women's Pro-Wrestling dissolved, splitting into LLPW and JWP. These promotions worked together with FMW and All Japan Women's Pro-Wrestling to create a critically acclaimed era with several classic matches authorized by the American wrestling publication Wrestling Observer Newsletter featuring wrestlers such as Manami Toyota, Aja Kong, Kyoko Inoue, Bull Nakano, Mayumi Ozaki, Megumi Kudo, Dynamite Kansai amongsts others. This era was also notable for multiple wrestlers returning from retirement such as Chigusa Nagayo, Lioness Asuka, Jaguar Yokota, Devil Masami and Bison Kimura, which increased interest.

In 2022, New Japan Pro Wrestling followed FMW's example by inaugurating their own IWGP Women's Championship.

See also 
 Japanese martial arts
 Mixed martial arts
 Global Professional Wrestling Alliance
 List of professional wrestling promotions in Japan

Notes

References

External links 
 Puroresu.com
 PuroresuCentral.com
 Marcus' Puro
 PuroLove.com (in German)
 BAHU's FMW World
 Monthly Puroresu

 
Professional wrestling genres